Iikka Keränen, a native of Finland, lives in Seattle, Washington with his dog. He is a level designer at Valve. He also co-founded Digital Eel, an independent video game development group, in 2001. His range of professional skills include illustration, 2D game art, 3D modeling, programming and game design.

In his teens, Keränen programmed freeware games for the Commodore Amiga. Later he created the popular Quake mod Airquake, as well as over a hundred free add-on levels for the Doom and Quake series of first-person shooters. He was named the top Doom level maker of all time by Doomworld in 1998, described as "one of a few pioneer level designers that created the new bottom line for playability and design in Doom levels, as well as helping to develop some of the special FX that many level authors now take for granted".

In recent years he has created 3D architecture, textures and models for many well known computer games including Daikatana, Anachronox, Thief II: The Metal Age, American McGee's Alice and Valve's Counter-Strike, Half-Life 2, Portal 2, Day of Defeat and Team Fortress 2. In December 2005, Iikka completed "Argentan", a map for the multiplayer video game Day of Defeat: Source.

His Digital Eel credits include design, programming and art. He co-designed all Digital Eel games to date (Plasmaworm, Strange Adventures in Infinite Space, Dr. Blob's Organism, Digital Eel's Big Box of Blox, Weird Worlds: Return to Infinite Space, Eat Electric Death!, Soup du Jour, Goblin Slayer and Brainpipe) with Rich Carlson.

References

External links

Finnish expatriates in the United States
Video game programmers
Living people
Year of birth missing (living people)
Finnish computer programmers
Finnish video game designers
Indie video game developers